Granite Bay High School is located in Granite Bay, California, United States. Granite Bay High School was founded in 1996 and was named a National Blue Ribbon School by the United States Secretary of Education in 2002 and a California Distinguished School in 2007. It is one of the five comprehensive schools in the Roseville Joint Union High School District. Granite Bay High School has more than 20 Advanced Placement classes, and is one of two schools in RJUHSD to have the International Baccalaureate program.

Extracurricular activities

Theatre arts 
Granite Bay High School has a full-time theatre arts department, known as "Theatre at Granite Bay." The program offers beginning, intermediate and advanced level acting courses, as well as musical theatre and technical theatre. Productions are staged in the James T. Prichard Performing Arts Center, the 500-seat theater on campus named after the high school's late theatre arts teacher. After Prichard retired in 2011, Kyle Holmes took over as the Director of Theatre Arts.

In 2018, Theatre at Granite Bay premiered Ranked, a new musical written by Holmes and musical director, David Taylor Gomes. The musical focuses on academic pressure that GBHS students faced, and launched the school's theatre program into the national spotlight during the 2019 College Admission Scandal.

Holmes then retired in 2021, leaving Zachary Magan to lead the program. Magan had formerly worked at a high school in Elk Grove, CA as a theatre director.

Band programs 
Granite bay has a marching band known as the Emerald Brigade, as well as 2 concert ensembles and a jazz band. The Emerald brigade has won multiple awards.

Choir 
Granite Bay has two choirs, Concert and Chamber.

Science Olympiad 
Granite Bay High School has a Science Olympiad team now in its third year of operation. They are a member of Sacramento Regional Science Olympiad.

Athletic teams

Fall teams 
Cross Country; Freshman, Junior Varsity, and Varsity, Football; Women's Golf; Women's Tennis; Women's Freshman, Junior Varsity, and Varsity Volleyball; Men's Junior Varsity, and Varsity Water Polo; Women's Junior Varsity, and Varsity Water Polo

Winter teams 
Men's Freshman, Junior Varsity, and Varsity Basketball; Women's Freshman, Junior Varsity, and Varsity Basketball; Men's Junior Varsity, and Varsity Soccer; Women's Junior Varsity, and Varsity Soccer; Wrestling

Spring teams 
Men's Freshman, Junior Varsity, and Varsity Baseball; Distance Track; Track and Field; Men's Junior Varsity, and Varsity Golf; Men's lacrosse; Women's lacrosse; Women's Junior Varsity, and Varsity Softball; Swimming; Men's Tennis; Men's Junior Varsity, and Varsity Volleyball

Notable alumni 
 Alyssa Anderson – Olympic swimmer
 Haley Anderson – Olympic swimmer
 Miles Burris – Actor and former NFL linebacker
 Kevin Dahlgren – US national convicted of murdering four relatives in Czech Republic in 2013
 Natalie Gulbis – LPGA golfer
 Ryan Holiday (2005) – bestselling author and director of marketing, American Apparel
 Adam Jennings (2001) – former wide receiver for the Atlanta Falcons
 Kevin Kiley (2003) – California State Assemblyman
 Andrew Knapp (2010) - catcher for the Pittsburgh Pirates
 Alicia Parlette – copy editor and former columnist at the San Francisco Chronicle
 Dallas Sartz (2002) – former linebacker for the Washington Redskins and Seattle Seahawks
 Cameron Smith (2015) –  linebacker for the Minnesota Vikings
 Sammie Stroughter (2004) – Oregon State University and Tampa Bay Buccaneers football player
 Peyton Thompson – NFL player Jacksonville Jaguars
 Devon Wylie (2007) – former wide receiver for Fresno State and 2012 NFL Draft pick of the Kansas City Chiefs

References

External links
 

High schools in Placer County, California
International Baccalaureate schools in California
Educational institutions established in 1996
Public high schools in California
1996 establishments in California